"That Summer, at Home I Had Become the Invisible Boy" is a song by Scottish indie rock band The Twilight Sad, that appears on the EP The Twilight Sad, and their debut album, Fourteen Autumns & Fifteen Winters. The song was released as the album's first single on 16 April 2007 on Fat Cat Records. The title is a reference to the film Stand by Me.

Track listing

Credits
 James Alexander Graham – vocals
 Andy MacFarlane – guitar, accordion
 Craig Orzel – bass
 Mark Devine – drums
 Produced by The Twilight Sad
 "That Summer, at Home" recorded by David Paterson
 "Watching That Chair Painted Yellow" recorded by Paul Savage
 Mixed by Peter Katis
 Mastered by Jesse Baccus and Alan Douches
 dlt – artwork

References

External links
Single synopsis at Fat Cat Records

2007 debut singles
The Twilight Sad songs
2007 songs